Haras may refer to:
 Al-Haras or the Haras, a bodyguard unit in service of caliphs during the Umayyad and the Abbasid caliphates
 Haras Fyre (born 1953), an American songwriter, singer and multi-instrumentalist
 Oleh Haras (Russian: Олег Зиновьевич Гарас, born 1976), a Ukrainian professional football player